This is a list of women writers who were born in Azerbaijan or whose writings are closely associated with that country.

A
Dilara Aliyeva (1929–1991), philologist, translator, women's rights activist
Sakina Akhundzadeh (1865–1927), Azerbaijan's first woman playwright, novelist
Sara Ashurbeyli (1906–2001), historian, orientalist, non-fiction historical works
Hanimana Alibeyli (1920–2007), Azerbaijani poet-playwright, children's writer

B
Alaviyya Babayeva (1921–2014), children's writer, novelist, short story writer, translator
Banine, pen name of Umm-El-Banine Assadoulaeff (1905–1992), Azerbaijani-French novelist, non-fiction writer, author of Caucasian days

D
Mirvarid Dilbazi (1912–2001), acclaimed poet, children's writer, translator

G
Madina Gulgun (1926–1991), Iranian-Azerbaijani poet, journalist

H
Lala Hasanova (born 1978), science fiction novelist, short story writer

J
Aziza Jafarzadeh (1921–2003), philologist, novelist, biographer, short story writer
Aghabeyim agha Javanshir (1780–1832), pen name Aghabaji, poet
Hamida Javanshir (1873–1955), writer, feminist, educator

K
Narmin Kamal (born 1981), poet, essayist, novelist, short story writer
Heyran Khanim (1790–1848), poet

M
Afag Masud (born 1957), novelist, short story writer, playwright, essayist, translator, magazine editor

N
Khurshidbanu Natavan (1832–1897), acclaimed poet, many poems now used as folksongs
Sevinj Nurugizi (born 1964), children's writer, playwright, columnist, translator, textbook writer

P
Ganira Pashayeva (born 1975), politician, journalist, news editor-in-chief

R
Nigar Rafibeyli (1913–1981), poet, novelist, translator

Y
Gullu Yologlu (born 1963), non-fiction writer, ethnologist

See also
List of Azerbaijani writers
List of women writers

References

-
Azerbaijani women writers, List of
Writers
Writers, women